Culemborg is a municipality and a city in the centre of the Netherlands. The city had a population of 29,386 on 1 January 2022 and is situated just south of the Lek river. Direct train lines run from the railway station towards the cities of Utrecht and Den Bosch.

History

Culemborg, formerly also spelled Kuilenburg or Kuylenburgh, received city rights in 1318. For a long time, Culemborg was independent from any counties or duchies in the Netherlands. The city had gained the right of toll collection and the right of asylum: it was a so-called 'Vrijstad' (free city). In practice, this meant that people who had fled to Culemborg from other cities (for example due to bankruptcy) could evade their creditors in Culemborg. The creditors would not be allowed entry into the city. This did not mean that criminals could escape justice in Culemborg: the city had its own justice system which could sentence criminals. In Amsterdam, the phrase 'Naar Culemborg gaan'''  (Going to Culemborg) became synonymous with going bankrupt.

In Joan Blaeu's map of 1649, Culemborg remains entirely enclosed by walls behind its city moat-like encircling canals. The moated castle stands outside the city walls. Houses present a united front along streets and the two canals that cut the city in three sections, but they all face gardens behind, and market gardens are plentiful within the city walls.

In the beginning of the 18th century, Culemborg effectively lost its independence as it was incorporated into the Nijmegen Quarter, although it regained some sovereign rights. Later, it was given to stadholder Willem IV. To this day, the Dutch king Willem-Alexander remains count of Culemborg. In 1795, the city was occupied by French forces, who left the castle in such a despicable state it was demolished after the French had left. A few years later it was completely incorporated in the Bataafse Republiek, and losing its sovereign rights.

In 1868, a railway bridge was built over the river Lek which was the longest bridge in Europe for a few years. Just upstream of it is a reaction ferry

In 1995, Culemborg was one of the cities which was temporarily evacuated because of the risk of flooding.

Between 1994 and 2009 the city of Culemborg developed the innovative ecological neighbourhood EVA Lanxmeer. Close collaboration with inhabitants and experimental sustainable design has made the neighbourhood an international best practice.

Transportation
Culemborg is served by Culemborg railway station, which offers trains to Utrecht (city) 4x per hour and 2x per hour to 's-Hertogenbosch and Tiel each. The railway station also provides a bus hub, offering buses to the various neighbouring cities and villages (namely Buren, Beusichem and Nieuwegein).

TopographyDutch topographic map of the municipality of Culemborg, June 2015Economy
Dough processing company Rademaker BV, founded in 1977, moved to Culemborg in 1981 and still has their headquarters here.

Windmills
There are two traditional windmills in Culemborg, De Hoop and Johanna. The base of a third mill, De Koornvriend'', also survives.

Notable residents

 Anthony van Diemen (1593–1645), Governor-General of the Dutch East Indies
 Jan van Riebeeck (1619–1677) colonial administrator, founded Cape Town (South Africa)
 Roelof de Man (1634 - 1663), bookkeeper and second-in-charge to Jan van Riebeeck at founding of Cape Town (South Africa)
 Otto van Rees (1823–1892), minister and Governor-General of the Dutch East Indies
 Rudi Martinus van Dijk (1932–2003) a Dutch and Canadian composer of orchestral, chamber and vocal music
 Wilhelmina Cooper (1939–1980), fashion model, founded Wilhelmina Models, New York
 Farid Azarkan (born 1971), politician and leader of Denk
 Jelka van Houten (born 1978), actress

Sport 
 Elly van Hulst (born 1959), middle distance runner, competed at the 1984 and 1988 Summer Olympics
 Patrick Pothuizen (born 1972), football player over 450 club caps
 Michiel Elijzen (born 1982) a Dutch former professional road bicycle racer

Gallery

References

External links

 

 
Municipalities of Gelderland
Populated places in Gelderland
Cities in the Netherlands